Haedo is a town  located in Morón Partido, Buenos Aires Province, Argentina. It forms part of the urban conurbation of Greater Buenos Aires.

With a surface of 6.11 km², it had 38,068 inhabitants as of 2001, down 13% from the 1991 census. Nonetheless, it is the fourth most populated unit (localidad) in Morón Partido, with a 12% of the total.

This city was the place of residence of the Buenos Aires governor Manuel Fresco located between Caseros 200 and Llavallol 1220.

Transport
The railway station was opened on 1 August 1886, and it was originally serviced by the Buenos Aires Western Railway.

References

External links

 Haedo public library

Morón Partido
Populated places in Buenos Aires Province
Populated places established in 1886
Cities in Argentina